Knockout is a 1935 German sports film directed by Carl Lamac and Hans H. Zerlett and starring Anny Ondra, Max Schmeling, and Hans Schönrath. After impressing a boxing trainer during a brawl over a woman, a young man is recruited and trained to be a boxer. He fights and defeats the British champion.

Schmeling was a leading international boxer and the film was an attempt to capitalize on his fame. Schmeling and Ondra, who plays the romantic love interest, were married in real life. It was shot at the Bavaria Studios in Munich. The film's sets were designed by the art directors Wilhelm Depenau and Erich Zander.

Cast

References

External links

German boxing films
1930s sports films
Films directed by Hans H. Zerlett
Films directed by Karel Lamač
Films of Nazi Germany
German black-and-white films
Films shot at Bavaria Studios
1930s German films